Forbush is an unincorporated community in central Yadkin County, North Carolina, United States. The community is named for George Forbush, one of the earliest European settlers in Northwestern North Carolina. Forbush, who moved south from Maryland, Pennsylvania and Virginia, settled on the west bank of the Yadkin River about two miles north of Shallow Ford in 1748.

The community shares its name with the Forbush Township.

References

Unincorporated communities in Yadkin County, North Carolina
Unincorporated communities in North Carolina